William Bourne may refer to:

Politicians
William Bourne (MP of Bedford) (by 1499–1545), MP for Bedford
William Bourne of Derby, MP for Derby in 1297

Others
William Bourne (mathematician) (1535–1582), English mathematician
William Bourne (19th century businessman), see Denby Pottery Company
Bill Bourne (cricketer) (born 1952), Barbadian cricketer
Bill Bourne (born 1954), Canadian musician and songwriter